Barcelona as the capital of Catalonia, the second biggest city in Spain and sixth-most populous urban area in the European Union, is a city with one of the largest number of skyscrapers in Europe. The recent trend in architecture in recent years has been promoting the construction of high-rise buildings as part of a wider modernisation plan that has been taking place since 1992, the year the Olympic games were held in Barcelona. Most of the skyscrapers in Barcelona were built in the 70s, 90s, and after 2002.

Barcelona has a few clusters of skyscrapers (outside the historic city center): Diagonal Mar (nearly twenty skyscrapers), Gran Via (about fifteen skyscrapers), around Plaça d'Espanya (a few skyscrapers) and Eix Macià (a few skyscrapers). The other skyscrapers are scattered about the city.

As for the number of skyscrapers above , Barcelona has a 7th place in the European Union. When it comes to use, most skyscrapers is the office buildings and hotels.

Tallest buildings
The list includes buildings (above ) in the city of Barcelona and its metropolitan area.

list not full

Tallest under construction - approved and proposed

Gallery

Tallest structures

Tall structures of unknown height:
 Onde Cero Radio Mast. Guyed mast used by "Onde Cero" for broadcasting on 540 kHz

See also

Sources and external links

 Report for Barcelona at Emporis
 Report for Barcelona at SkyscraperPage
 Report for Barcelona at Structurae
 Fira Towers in progress. Photos and architectural review by a+t architecture publishers

References

Barcelona
Tallest buildings and structures in Barcelona
Tallest buildings and structures in Barcelona